Yong-nam is a Korean masculine given name. Its meaning differs based on the hanja used to write each syllable of the name.

Hanja
There are 24 hanja with the reading "yong" and five hanja with the reading "nam" on the South Korean government's official list of hanja which may be used in given names. Additionally, there is one hanja with the reading "ryong" (meaning "dragon") which may also be written and pronounced "yong" in South Korea, where the historical initial rieul (ㄹ) is not pronounced due to the dueum beopchik rule of phonology in the standard language. Ways of writing this name in hanja include:

 (날랠 용 nallael yong, 사내 남 sanae nam): "brave man". These characters are also used to write various Japanese given names, including Isao and Takeo.
 (용 룡/용 용 yong ryong/yong yong, 사내 남 sanae nam): "dragon man". These characters are also used to write the Japanese given name Tatsuo.

People
People with this name include:
Sin Yong-nam (born 1978), North Korean footballer
Kwon Yong-nam (born 1985), South Korean footballer
Ri Ryong-nam (리룡남), North Korean politician, member of the Cabinet of North Korea

See also
List of Korean given names
Kim Yong-nam (born 1928), North Korean politician, Chairman of the Presidium of the Supreme People's Assembly

References

Korean masculine given names